Jakub Illéš (born 15 December 1995) is a Czech professional ice hockey centre playing for HC Dukla Jihlava of the Chance Liga.

Illéš previously played 35 games for HC Vítkovice of the Czech Extraliga between 2015 and 2017. On 24 May 2019, Illéš moved to Aigles de Nice of the Ligue Magnus in France. He would leave the team in December however after 18 games without scoring a goal and returned to the Czech Republic with HC Dukla Jihlava of the Chance Liga.

References

External links

1995 births
Living people
Les Aigles de Nice players
Czech ice hockey centres
HC Dukla Jihlava players
AZ Havířov players
LHK Jestřábi Prostějov players
HC RT Torax Poruba players
Hokej Šumperk 2003 players
Sportspeople from Ostrava
VHK Vsetín players
HC Vítkovice players
Czech expatriate sportspeople in France
Expatriate ice hockey players in France
PSG Berani Zlín players